The Zuma Beach Stakes is a Grade III American Thoroughbred horse race for two-year-olds over a distance of one mile on the turf track scheduled annually in October at Santa Anita Park in Arcadia, California. The event currently carries a purse of $200,000.

History

The event is named after a popular beach, Zuma Beach, located in Los Angeles County, California.

The inaugural running of the event was inaugurated on October 8, 2012, and was won by the California-bred Gervinho who was trained by Carla Gaines and ridden by the Rafael Bejarano by half-a-length in a time of 1:34.59. Gervinho had a short but impressive career performing well in the Californian turf Derbys and winning the Grade II Sir Beaufort Stakes to be voted Californian Three-Year-Old of the Year in 2013.

The event is a preparatory race for the Breeders' Cup Juvenile Turf. Although no horse has won both events, 2014 winner of the Zuma Beach Stakes, Luck of the Kitten finished second in the Breeders' Cup Juvenile Turf to Hootenanny which was held also at Santa Anita Park.

The 2019 winner Hit The Road as a four-year-old went on to win a Grade 1 event (Frank E. Kilroe Mile Stakes)

In 2022 the event was upgraded by the Thoroughbred Owners and Breeders Association to a Grade III.

Records
Speed record:
1 mile: 1:33.56 – Big Score  (2016) 
 
Margins:
 lengths – Big Score (2016) 

Most wins by an owner:
 No owner has won the event more than once

Most wins by a jockey:
 2 – Corey Nakatani (2013, 2014)
 2 – Gary L. Stevens (2015, 2018)

Most wins by a trainer:
 No trainer has won the event more than once

Winners

Legend:

See also
List of American and Canadian Graded races

References

2012 establishments in California
Horse races in California
Santa Anita Park
Flat horse races for two-year-olds
Turf races in the United States
Graded stakes races in the United States
Recurring sporting events established in 2012
Grade 3 stakes races in the United States